is a Japanese comedy duo (kombi) consisting of Yū Sawabe (澤部佑) and Yūki Iwai (岩井勇気).  They have featured in a number of Japanese television shows. They are employed by Watanabe Entertainment, a talent agency based in Tokyo.

Beginning
Sawabe and Iwai have known each other since pre-school. They formed Haraichi in 2005, named after the local neighborhood of Haraichi (原市) in their hometown of Ageo, Saitama.

Members 
 Yū Sawabe (澤部佑) Born July 31, 1986, in Ageo, Saitama. Plays the tsukkomi.
 Yūki Iwai (岩井勇気) Born May 19, 1986, in Ageo, Saitama. Plays the boke and writes all their material.

Achievements 
 M-1 Grand Prix finalist, 5th place (2009)
 M-1 Grand Prix finalist, 7th place (2010)
 M-1 Grand Prix finalist, 9th place (2015)
 M-1 Grand Prix finalist, 6th place (2016)

Media

Television (Variety)

Current Regular (Sawabe) 
 Aiba Manabu (相葉マナブ) -- TV Asahi (4/21/2013-)
 Knight Scoop (探偵!ナイトスクープ) -- ABCTV (10/11/2013-)
 Hayashi-sensei no Hatsumimigaku (林先生が驚く初耳学!) -- MBS TV (4/12/2015-)
 Soko Magattara, Sakurazaka? (そこ曲がったら、櫻坂?) -- TV Tokyo (10/18/2020-) MC
 Naming Variety - Nihonjin no Namae! (ネーミングバラエティー 日本人のおなまえっ!) -- NHK General TV (4/6/2017-)
 Nariyuki Kaidotabi (なりゆき街道旅) -- Fuji TV (4/1/2018-) MC

Current Irregular (Sawabe) 
 Tokoton Horisagetai! Ikimono ni Thank you!! (トコトン掘り下げ隊!生き物にサンキュー!!) -- Tokyo Broadcasting System Television
 NBA Basketball (NBA バスケットボール) -- WOWOW

Current Regular (Iwai) 
 Oha Suta (おはスタ) -- TV Tokyo (4/2015-) Mondays
 HOT WAVE Neppa (HOT WAVE 熱波) -- Television Saitama (4/7/2016-)
 Hinekure 3 (ひねくれ3) -- TV Tokyo (4/6/2019-) MC

Former Irregular (Iwai) 
 Keyakitte, Kakenai? (欅って、書けない?) -- TV Tokyo (11/30/2015-10/12/2020)

Current Irregular (Both) 
 Tamori Club (タモリ俱楽部) -- TV Asahi

References

External links 
 Haraichi's official profile on Watanabe Productions homepage
 Yūki Iwai - Twitter

Japanese comedy duos
People from Ageo, Saitama